is a war museum in Minamisatsuma, Kagoshima Prefecture. Opened in 1993, the museum commemorates the 201 airmen from the  who died in a kamikaze attack in the final months of the Pacific War.  Hichiro Naemura, a flight instructor at the Bansei base in 1945, spearheaded the effort to establish this institution as a memorial to his fallen comrades.

See also
 Kamikaze
 Chiran Peace Museum for Kamikaze Pilots
 Cornerstone of Peace

References

World War II suicide weapons of Japan
World War II memorials in Japan
World War II museums in Japan
Peace museums
Museums in Kagoshima Prefecture
Kamikaze
Museums established in 1993
1993 establishments in Japan
Minamisatsuma, Kagoshima